Drypetes hoaensis is an Asian tree species in the family Putranjivaceae.

The recorded occurrence of this species is from Yunnan, Thailand and Vietnam (where it may be called sang trắng Biên Hòa or táo vòng Biên Hòa).

References

External links

 Flora of Indo-China 
 Trees of Vietnam
hoaensis